The 2021 Lory Meagher Cup was the 13th staging of the Lory Meagher Cup hurling championship.

Competition Format 
Cup format

The format was changed for 2021, with 5 teams playing across two groups, one with 3 teams and one with 2 teams based on an open draw.

Group A featured 3 teams and was played in a single Round Robin format with each team having one home game and one away game.

Group B featured 2 teams who played a single fixture.

All teams played a knockout format after this group stage, with the group winners and second-placed team in Group A being placed in the semi-finals. A tie between the third-placed team in Group A and second-placed team in Group B determined the fourth semi-finalist.

All-Ireland Senior Hurling Championship

There was no direct qualification to the All-Ireland Senior Hurling Championship proper for Lory Meagher Cup teams.

Promotion to Nicky Rackard Cup

The winner of the Lory Meagher Cup was also promoted automatically to the following year's Nicky Rackard Cup, which is the fourth tier of the All-Ireland Senior Hurling Championship. They would be replaced by the bottom-placed team in the 2021 Nicky Rackard Cup.

Relegation

There was no relegation from the Lory Meagher Cup as this is the lowest grade (5th Tier) in the All-Ireland Senior Hurling Championship.

Group stage

Group A 

{| class="wikitable" style="text-align:center"
!width=20|
!width=150 style="text-align:left;"|Team
!width=20|
!width=20|
!width=20|
!width=20|
!width=50|
!width=50|
!width=20|
!width=20|
!Qualification
|- style="background:#ccffcc"
|1||align=left| Longford||2||1||1||0||9-41||3-38||+21||3
| rowspan="2" |Advance to Semi-Finals
|- style="background:#ccffcc"
|2|| align="left" | Louth||2||1||0||1||6-34||8-42||-14||2
|- style="background:#FFFFE0"
|3|| align="left" | Monaghan||2||0||1||1||0-36||4-31||-7||1
|Advance to Quarter-Finals
|}

Group A round 1

Group A round 2

Group A round 3

Group B 

{| class="wikitable" style="text-align:center"
!width=20|
!width=150 style="text-align:left;"|Team
!width=20|
!width=20|
!width=20|
!width=20|
!width=50|
!width=50|
!width=20|
!width=20|
!Qualification
|- style="background:#ccffcc"
|1||align=left| Cavan||1||1||0||0||1-16||0-17||+2||2
|Advance to Semi-Finals
|- style="background:#FFFFE0"
|2|| align="left" | Fermanagh||1||0||0||1||0-17||1-16||-2||0
|Advance to Quarter-Finals
|}

Group A round 1

Knockout stage

Bracket

Final

References 

Lory Meagher Cup
Lory Meagher Cup